A list of films released in Japan in 1980 (see 1980 in film).

Box-office ranking

List of films

See also
1980 in Japan
1980 in Japanese television

References

Footnotes

Sources

External links
 Japanese films of 1980 at the Internet Movie Database

1980
Lists of 1980 films by country or language
Films